Guttigera schefflerella is a moth of the family Gracillariidae. It is found in Japan (Kagoshima and Okinawa).

The wingspan is 6.1–8.1 mm. The forewings are white with ochreous oblique streaks with dark brown scales. The hindwings are white. There are multiple generations per year.

The larvae feed on Schefflera octophylla. They mine the leaves of their host plant. The mine has the form of a broad, long serpentine mine. The frass is pale brown to blackish brown. Usually, there are one to two mines per foliole. Larvae emerge in early spring and autumn. Older larvae are pale yellow.

Etymology
The name is derived from Schefflera, the generic name of the host plant.

References

Moths described in 2013
Phyllocnistinae
Moths of Japan